Anar County is in Kerman province, Iran. The capital of the county is the city of Anar. At the 2006 census, the county's population (as Anar District of Rafsanjan County) was 31,554 in 7,803 households. The following census in 2011 counted 35,295 people in 9,566 households, by which time the district had been separated from the county to form Anar County. At the 2016 census, the county's population was 36,897 in 10,918 households.

Administrative divisions

The population history of Anar County's administrative divisions over three consecutive censuses is shown in the following table. The latest census shows one district, two rural districts, and two cities.

References

 

Counties of Kerman Province